Louise Latimer (born 19 January 1978) is a former professional tennis player from Great Britain.

Biography
Latimer was born and raised in Norwich for the first 12 years of her life, before her family moved to Sutton Coldfield in Birmingham. Her father Colin worked at Birmingham University and her mother Jo was a nurse.

A right-handed player, Latimer turned professional in 1995 and won her first ITF title in Portugal in 1997.

Latimer debuted in the Wimbledon main draw in 1998 and beat Jana Kandarr, before exiting in the second round. She made the second round at Wimbledon on a further two occasions, including in 2000, when she took 11th seed Anke Huber to three sets.

In 2000 she won two ITF $25,000 titles, in Hull and Surbiton. To win the title in Surbiton she defeated Tamarine Tanasugarn in the final and earlier in the tournament had a win over Alexandra Stevenson.

Latimer featured in a total of 11 Fed Cup ties for Great Britain. She had a 4/5 record in singles and was unbeaten in her four doubles rubbers.

Having ended both 1999 and 2000 as the British number one, Latimer peaked at 107 in the world in January, 2001, before retiring mid year following a drop in form.

ITF finals

Singles (4–1)

Doubles (1–3)

See also
List of Great Britain Fed Cup team representatives

References

External links
 
 
 

1978 births
Living people
British female tennis players
Sportspeople from Norwich
Tennis people from Norfolk